The Women's 5 kilometre cross-country skiing event was part of the cross-country skiing programme at the 1988 Winter Olympics, in Calgary, Canada. It was the seventh appearance of the event. The competition was held on 17 February 1988, at the Canmore Nordic Centre.

Results

References

Women's cross-country skiing at the 1988 Winter Olympics
Women's 5 kilometre cross-country skiing at the Winter Olympics
Oly
Cross